Something in My Heart is a 1944 novel by the British writer Walter Greenwood. It is a loose sequel to his debut and best-known novel Love on the Dole, a 1933 work set in Salford at the height of the Great Depression. This book presented a more optimistic view of a potential postwar future that was absent in the despair in the original novel.

Synopsis
The story opens in 1937 with Helen Oakroyd working in a textile mill while her two friends Harry and Taffy are both on the dole. When war breaks out with Nazi Germany in 1939 both enlist in the RAF.

References

Bibliography
 Hopkins, Chris. Walter Greenwood's Love on the Dole: Novel, Play, Film. Oxford University Press, 2018.

1944 British novels
Novels by Walter Greenwood
Novels set in Manchester
Novels set in the 1930s
Hutchinson (publisher) books